The British Consulate at Takao (or Ta-kau) is a former British consulate built in 1865 in Gushan District, Kaohsiung, Taiwan. It has been designated a historic site by the Ministry of Culture.

It lies on the peak of Shaochuantou (哨船頭) and overlooks Sizihwan Bay and the Port of Kaohsiung. It currently serves as a cafe and tourist attraction.

History

In 1860 the Treaty of Peking forced the Qing dynasty to open up the ports of Takau (now called Kaohsiung), An-ping (Anping, Tainan), Tamsui (Tamsui, New Taipei) and Keelung to foreign trade. As the largest empire of the time, Britain was one of the first western countries to establish a consulate, appointing Robert Swinhoe as the first British vice-consul in 1861, although he was unable to physically obtain the post until 1862. Initially the consulate was centered in Tamsui, but in 1864 the office was moved to Takau.

The building itself was built in 1879 by  overlooking Takao Harbor and the materials were brought over from the city of Amoy (Xiamen) on mainland China. It was rented by the British Government in 1867. In the same year Swinhoe was appointed as the first Consul General in Formosa, a post he would hold until his retirement from government service in 1873.

Following the First Sino-Japanese War, the 1895 Treaty of Shimonoseki ceded the island of Formosa (as well as the Pescadores) to the Empire of Japan. Although the Treaty prompted the Triple Intervention by Russia, Germany, and France it appears to have had little effect on Britain, and thus no major events took place at the consulate at this time. In 1909, however, the Japanese government of Taiwan claimed the right to all foreign consulates in Taiwan and the British consulate was closed the next year. In 1931 the building was converted into an "Ocean Observatory" by the Japanese viceroy.

Although the walls of the consulate were painted with white cement in 1944 to avoid U.S. bombing attacks, the building saw very little action during the Second World War and does not appear to have been used for any important purpose. It was converted again to a Weather Bureau Observatory in 1945, shortly before Taiwan was handed over to Republic of China; it remained in this state for the next forty-one years.

In 1986 the Kaohsiung municipal government commissioned Li Chien Lang to restore the former consulate as a museum in which to store historic documents and cultural products; it was declared to be a Second Class Historic Site the next year. In 2003 the building was placed under the responsibility of the newly created Cultural Bureau of Kaohsiung, which appointed the Kingship Continental Hotel Group to finish the restoration and manage the building. An opening ceremony was held in September.

In 2005 the former consulate was the first-place recipient of the prestigious Yuan-Yeh Award and recorded over 400 000 visitors. In 2006 it was the site of over one hundred artistic and cultural activities, including the National Oil Painting Competition and National Photography Competition. In 2007 it was visited by the United Nations Observatory Group as well as leaders and representatives of members of the Democratic Pacific Union and the restoration of 312 oil paintings in the former consulate and surrounding area was completed.

The building

The consulate was designed by a British architect and built by McPhail & Co. in 1865 using Chinese architects. The materials were shipped over from the city of Amoy (now Xiamen) across the Taiwan Strait. The architecture is that of the late Renaissance, providing a technical and stylistic basis for later Western buildings in Taiwan, and makes use of many arches. There are two floors.

Transportation
The building is accessible within walking distance West from Sizihwan Station of the Kaohsiung MRT.

See also
 List of museums in Taiwan
 Shoushan (Kaohsiung)

References

External links

 Official Site (English)
 kaohsiungwalking.kcg.gov.tw
 http://www.takaoclub.com/consulate/index.htm

1879 establishments in Taiwan
Foreign affairs in Kaohsiung
Buildings and structures in Kaohsiung
Commercial buildings completed in 1865
Tourist attractions in Kaohsiung
Gushan District
Takao
Taiwan–United Kingdom relations
National monuments of Taiwan